Major League Wrestling (MLW) is an American professional wrestling promotion based in New Rochelle, New York. 

Active wrestlers and on-screen talent appear on MLW Underground Wrestling, MLW Fusion and at live events. Personnel is organized below by their role in MLW. Their ring name is on the left, and their real name is on the right. MLW refers to its in-ring performers as "Fighters" as opposed to the traditional nomenclature "wrestlers" to separate itself from other promotions, along with referring to the traditional position of manager/valet as "promoter."

MLW has international promotional partnerships with Lucha Libre AAA Worldwide, The Crash Lucha Libre, the International Wrestling Association, Pro Wrestling Noah, Dragon Gate, and All Japan Pro Wrestling. Wrestlers from those promotions may make occasional appearances on MLW events and programming.

Personnel

Male wrestlers

Female wrestlers

Referees

Other on-air personnel
Note: MLW refers to its managers and valets as "promoters."

Broadcast team

Backstage personnel

References

Major League Wrestling
Major League Wrestling